Yordi Teijsse (born 19 July 1992) is a Dutch professional footballer who currently plays as a forward for VV Unicum. He has previously played for Pancratius, Ter Leede, Quick Boys, Dundee, Wuppertaler SV, Quick Boys, AFC and Kozakken Boys.

While playing at Quick Boys, he earned the Player of the Season award from the club.

Teijsse signed for Scottish Premiership club Dundee in May 2016. He made some appearances early in the 2016/17 season, but fell out of favour after October. He moved on loan to German club Wuppertaler SV in January 2017.

His twin brother, Kenny Teijsse, is also a professional footballer.

References

External links

Yordi Teijsse at FuPa.net

1992 births
Living people
Dutch twins
Identical twins
Twin sportspeople
Dutch footballers
Footballers from Amsterdam
Quick Boys players
Dundee F.C. players
Dutch expatriate footballers
Expatriate footballers in Scotland
Dutch expatriate sportspeople in Scotland
Scottish Professional Football League players
Association football forwards
Wuppertaler SV players
Expatriate footballers in Germany
Dutch expatriate sportspeople in Germany
Ter Leede players
Kozakken Boys players